Candida Donadio (October 22, 1929 - January 20, 2001) was an American literary agent. She represented many writers, including postmodern novelists Joseph Heller, William Gaddis, and Thomas Pynchon.

And Cormac McCarthy:
McCarthy goes on to tell Woolmer, “My agent for several years was Candida Donadio …”

source: https://www.texasobserver.org/unpacking-cormac-mccarthy/

Life
Donadio was born on October 22, 1929, in Brooklyn, New York City. Her parents were immigrants from Italy.

Donadio began her career by working as a secretary for Herb Jaffe. She eventually founded her own literary agency, and she represented Bruce Jay Friedman, William Gaddis, Joseph Heller, Michael Herr, Thomas Pynchon, Mario Puzo, and Robert Stone. Heller's Catch-22 was initially called Catch 18, and it was changed to her birthday to avoid confusion with Leon Uris's Mila 18. In 1984, Donadio sold 120 letters written by Pynchon to herself between 1962 and 1983 to Carter Burden for $45,000 via Santa Barbara book dealer Ralph Sipper.

Donadio resided in Stonington, Connecticut. She was diagnosed with cancer in 1995, and she died on January 20, 2001.

1929 births
2001 deaths
American people of Italian descent
People from Brooklyn
People from Stonington, Connecticut
Literary agents
Deaths from cancer in Connecticut